Aubrey Wentworth is a fictional character from the ABC daytime soap opera One Life to Live portrayed by Terri Conn from November 29, 2010, to December 29, 2011. After the cancellation of As the World Turns in 2010, Conn left her role as then Katie Peretti and joined the cast of One Life to Live as newly-created character Aubrey. Aubrey began her time in town as a smart and beautiful con artist but soon developed into a more caring person with a less criminal outlook on life.

Casting and characterization
Terri Conn was offered the new role of Aubrey Wentworth following the cancellation and series finale of the CBS daytime drama As the World Turns, less than two months earlier. After having spent 12 years as Katie Peretti from 1998 until 2010 and a guest starring role on CBS' The Young and the Restless in 1995, Conn remained a part of the genre after the show contacted her agent after releasing a casting call for the character. After screen testing with  OLTL star Erika Slezak (Victoria Lord) and David Fumero (Cristian Vega), Conn was hired for the role. Conn's continued career was considered a relief to the actress because of the difficult job market as well as the new direction she would be taking by playing a more mature role.

Conn commented on the development of the character and the difference between her OLTL and ATWT roles in an interview with TV Guide columnist Michael Logan:

The casting coincided with the hirings of former World Turns co-star Tom Degnan (Joey Buchanan) and newcomer Josh Kelly (Cutter Wentworth). The arrivals would permit a love quadrangle between these three characters and Kelly Cramer, played by Gina Tognoni, who rejoined the show several months earlier after the cancellation of another long running CBS daytime drama, Guiding Light.

Storylines
Aubrey Wentworth comes to town on a plane coming from London to visit her boyfriend Joey Buchanan in Llanview. She meets Joey's ex-wife Kelly Cramer, and both women are unaware of the other's feelings for Joey. Aubrey arrives and meets Joey's parents Clint Buchanan and Victoria Lord and accepts Joey's surprising marriage proposal, where Kelly learns the two were a couple. As Kelly and Aubrey's rivalry grows, Aubrey's real boyfriend Cutter Wentworth arrives and it is apparent that the pair are planning on conning Joey of his fortune after she marries him. As Cutter poses as her brother, they succeed in keeping her secret from being revealed by Kelly and her aunt Dorian Lord. However, their deception comes out when she and Joey take care of Ryder Ford, the son of Jessica Buchanan while she is under the influence of her alternate personality "Tess." Aubrey wants to be honest with Joey because she finally recognizes her feelings for him and tells him about her and Cutter's real plans, but Joey breaks up with her and Jessica soon regains custody of her son. After Cutter discovers that Aubrey has actual feelings for Joey, he shocks Aubrey by eloping with Tess/Jessica and blackmailing Clint for a piece of his fortune and ownership of The Buchanan Mansion in exchange for committing their daughter to St. Anne's. Cutter later loses his piece of the Buchanan fortune and the mansion when he discovers that Clint had a loophole in the mansion's deed that he could take back ownership of the mansion anytime he wants to. Clint gives the mansion to his long-lost son Rex Balsom after he blackmails him for his entire fortune so that his recently "deceased" fiancée Gigi Morasco can donate her heart to Clint after he suffered a major heart attack. It later turns out that he got the heart of Gigi's sister Stacy Morasco when it was later revealed that Gigi was still alive.

After Joey and Kelly reunite and leave town following his divorce from Aubrey, she shortly reunites with Cutter after they begin a life without crime. However, she breaks up with him again after learning his attempt to con Clint's other son, Rex after the "death" of his fiancée Gigi, following the reveal that Aubrey's real name was Kristine Karr and the real Aubrey Wentworth was Cutter's own sister Kimberly Andrews. Kristine took on the name so that she and Cutter could con rich men out of money under the disguise of brother and sister. Aubrey eventually becomes a confidant for Rex and his son Shane Morasco as Cutter tries to con them out of their family's money with the fact that Gigi was still alive and it was her sister Stacy who died. Cutter is eventually arrested and Kim leaves town. After Rex and Shane reunite with Gigi, Aubrey realizes she no longer has a place in anyone's lives and leaves town.

References

External links
Aubrey Wentworth profile – SoapCentral.com

Television characters introduced in 2010
One Life to Live characters
Fictional con artists
Fictional bartenders
Female characters in television
Fictional criminals in soap operas